Zijin County (postal: Tzekam; ; Hakka Pha̍k-fa-sṳ: Tsṳ́-kîm-yen) is a county in the east of Guangdong Province, China. It is the southernmost county-level division of the prefecture-level city of Heyuan. The county was known as Yongan County (postal: Wingon) before January 1914.

Language 

As citizens in Zijin are mostly Hakka people, Hakka Chinese is the most common language there.

Economy 

In 2007, GRP of Zijin is 46.7 hundred million dollars, and its gross output value of industry and agriculture is 55.21 hundred million dollars.

Climate

References

External links 
Zijin County Official Website

County-level divisions of Guangdong
Heyuan